Operation Mountain Thrust was a NATO and Afghan-led operation in the War in Afghanistan, with more than 3,300 British troops, 2,300 U.S., 2,200 Canadian troops, about 3,500 Afghan soldiers and large air support.  Its primary objective was to quell the ongoing Taliban insurgency in the south of the country.

Results
There was heavy fighting during June and July 2006, with Afghanistan seeing the bloodiest period since the fall of the Taliban regime. The Taliban showed great coordination in their attacks, even capturing two districts of Helmand province at the end of July, which were retaken a few days later. The Taliban suffered during the fighting more than 1,100 killed and close to 400 captured. Heavy aerial bombing was the main factor. But even so the coalition forces had close to 150 soldiers killed and 40 Afghan policemen captured by the Taliban. Tom Koenigs, the top U.N. official in Afghanistan, told the German news weekly Der Spiegel that the Taliban numbers of casualties do not reflect success. "The Taliban fighters reservoir is practically limitless," Koenigs told the magazine in an interview. "The movement will not be overcome by high casualty figures."

In the end, the operation did not manage to quell the Taliban insurgency. Control of the region was transferred from the Americans to NATO forces. Attacks continued and even intensified. On the first day that NATO took control, August 1, a British patrol was hit by enemy fire in Helmand province; three soldiers were killed and one wounded. On the same day 18 Taliban and one policeman were killed in an anti-Taliban coalition operation in the same province and 15 Afghan policemen were captured when they surrendered in Zabul province while a Taliban force was preparing to attack their police post. Also two days later there were several incidents in and around Kandahar, including a suicide bombing which killed 21 civilians. In the other attacks in and around Kandahar, four Canadian soldiers were killed and ten were wounded.

Known Encounters
May 16–17, 2006 Musa Qala, Helmand
May 19–20, 2006 Kajaki, Helmand
May 21–22, 2006 Panjwayi, Kandahar (see Battle of Panjwaii)
May 23–24, 2006 Tarin Kowt, Uruzgan
May 26–27, 2006 Sak Qala, Helmand
May 29–30, 2006 Kajaki, Helmand 
June 10–11, 2006 Arghandab, Zabul
June 10–11, 2006 Deh Rawood, Uruzgan
June 14–15, 2006 Shah joy, Zabul
June 15–16, 2006 ?, Paktika
June 16–17, 2006 Musa Qala, Helmand
June 23–25, 2006 Operation Kaika, near Kandahar
June 25–26, 2006 Zharie, Kandahar, 
June 25–26, 2006 Tarin Kowt, Uruzgan, 
June 27–28, 2006 Musa Qala, Helmand
July 10–11, 2006 Tarin Kowt, Uruzgan

See also
Siege of Sangin
Coalition combat operations in Afghanistan in 2006
Operation Enduring Freedom
Taliban insurgency

References
"Revived Taliban waging 'full-blown insurgency'". June 19, 2006. USA Today.

External links
Articles about Operation Mountain Thrust

Operation Mountain Thrust
Military operations of the War in Afghanistan (2001–2021)
Military operations of the War in Afghanistan (2001–2021) involving Canada
Military operations of the War in Afghanistan (2001–2021) involving the Czech Republic
Military operations of the War in Afghanistan (2001–2021) involving Australia
Military operations of the War in Afghanistan (2001–2021) involving the United States
Military operations of the War in Afghanistan (2001–2021) involving the United Kingdom
Military operations of the War in Afghanistan (2001–2021) involving the Netherlands